Surti paneer is a soft cheese associated with Surat in India.  It is a type of paneer that is prepared from buffalo milk which is coagulated using rennet. The cheese is then ripened in whey for up to 36 hours. The cheese has a Portuguese influence. The name is derived from the town of Surat in the state of Gujarat, Western India, where it is thought to originate from.

See also
 List of water buffalo cheeses

References

Indian cheeses
Water buffalo's-milk cheeses
Surat